Rose Asikiyeoforiye George (17 April 1946 – 27 October 2010), was the First Lady of Rivers State from 1992 to 1993. She was the wife of Governor Rufus Ada George. At the age of 64, she was reported to have died of protracted illness in Los Angeles, California. According to Tributes.com, she resided in Inglewood, California until her death and was interred in Forest Lawn Memorial Park Cemetery in Glendale.

See also
List of people from Rivers State

References

External links

1946 births
2010 deaths
First Ladies and Gentlemen of Rivers State
Burials at Forest Lawn Memorial Park (Glendale)
People from Okrika